The blue-faced parrotfinch (Erythrura trichroa) is a locally common species of estrildid finch found in north-eastern Australia, Japan, Indonesia, Federated States of Micronesia, France (introduced), New Caledonia, Palau, Papua New Guinea, the Solomon Islands and Vanuatu. It has an estimated global extent of occurrence of 10,000,000 km2.

It is found in subtropical and tropical zones in both montane and lowland moist forest areas, where it is most often associated with forest edges and disturbed habitat. It feeds largely on seeds of grasses, including in Australia several exotic genera especially Brachiaria. The IUCN has classified the species as being of least concern.

Origin and history
Origin and phylogeny has been obtained by Antonio Arnaiz-Villena et al. Estrildinae may have originated in India and dispersed thereafter (towards Africa and Pacific Ocean habitats).

In the past, due to less developed observation techniques, very few blue-faced parrotfinches were spotted. As a result, they were overlooked in historical surveys and categorized as rare.

The first blue-faced parrotfinch was recorded in North Queensland, Australia in 1890. This specimen had a length of 121 mm (4.8 in). Its wings were 62 mm (2.4 in), its tail was 50 mm (2.0 in), and its culmen was 11 mm (0.4 in). It is now kept in the Melbourne Museum. There were other important discoveries of the blue-faced parrotfinch in 1899, 1913, 1914, and 1944, all of which were spotted in north or north-eastern Queensland.

Among the blue-faced parrotfinches in Queensland, one subspecies is Erythrura trichroa macgillivrayi but its conservation status is unknown.

Description 
Blue-faced parrotfinch males are multi-shaded with colors ranging from light yellow-green to dark blue-green. On their forehead and face, there are deep blue feathers, and their tails are generally red to rusty red-brown. In terms of length, they are typically 13 cm (5.1 in) long.

On the other hand, the females are covered with a less vibrant blue and are slightly smaller and have more rounded heads.

Among the birds found in Queensland, there was no significant difference in plumage, bill shapes, or genetic composition. This is hypothesized to be caused by nomadic behaviors and the continued gene flow.

Distribution and habitat 
The blue-faced parrotfinches prefer rainforest edges and dense grasslands that have woody plants, and they prefer to roost in rainforests. They are widely distributed and found at various altitudes, ranging from sea-level on hot tropical islands to 800-3000 m in New Guinea. It is reported that the blue-faced parrotfinches engage in seasonal and nomadic movements, partly due to their cold-sensitiveness. In the winter, they migrate to the lowlands where there is excessive rainforest clearance.

Behaviour 
The blue-faced parrotfinches are inconspicuous and timid, retreating to grasslands for cover.

Feeding 
Blue-faced parrotfinches feed on grass and bamboo seeds, small insects, and figs. They primarily consume seeds of Brachiaria decumbens (Signal Grass), then the seeds of Lantana camara (West Indian Lantana), Panicum maximum (Guinea Grass), and A. patrei. They are adaptive enough to eat introduced food sources when they appear.

They forage primarily by perching (at an average height of 0.96 m) and less frequently by climbing and pecking. Due to this, there is not much strong competition between blue-faced parrotfinches and their sympatric species, who tend to forage primarily by climbing. Another reason for this lack of competition is that blue-faced parrotfinches partition food resources with other species by foraging at different preferred microhabitats.

Blue-faced parrotfinches are generally seen in patches, occasionally with 30 or more birds. The number of finches seen together increases in response to sufficient food resources.

Breeding 
The females usually lay an average of four eggs, with a maximum of eight. The average incubation time is 15 days, during which the female does most of the incubation and brooding. Meanwhile, the male is responsible for feeding the nestlings. The nestlings fledge around 21 days and continue to be fed by their parents for 10 to 20 days.

References

External links
Species factsheet - BirdLife International

blue-faced parrotfinch
Birds of Sulawesi
Birds of the Maluku Islands
Birds of New Guinea
Birds of Micronesia
Birds of Melanesia
Birds of Cape York Peninsula
blue-faced parrotfinch
Taxa named by Heinrich von Kittlitz